Tado may refer to:

Tado, a village in Togo, Africa
Tado°, German high-tech company which engages in intelligent climate control
Tadó, town and municipality in Chocó Department, Colombia
Tado, a former West African kingdom
Tado, a village in the Manggrai district of Flores, Indonesia
Tado, Mie,  a town located in Kuwana District, Mie, Japan
The Lower Tado period of the Japanese Jōmon period
The Upper Tado period of the Japanese Jōmon period
Tado, a minion of Garlic Jr. from the Dragon Ball Z series
Tado (comedian), male comedian from the Philippines